Wildcat Creek Bridge is a covered bridge built in 1925 at Austa, near Walton, in the U.S. state of Oregon. It uses Howe truss engineering and was listed on the National Register of Historic Places in 1979. The  bridge carries Austa Road over Wildcat Creek near its confluence with the Siuslaw River.

The bridge is among those for which Lane County minted commemorative coins between 2005 and July 2012 for sale to the public to raise funds to maintain and repair covered bridges. Lane County owns 17 covered bridges, 14 of which are open to traffic. Through 2012, the county produced a total of 325 Wildcat Creek Bridge coins.

See also 
 List of bridges on the National Register of Historic Places in Oregon
 List of Oregon covered bridges

References

Covered bridges on the National Register of Historic Places in Oregon
Bridges completed in 1925
Covered bridges in Lane County, Oregon
1925 establishments in Oregon
National Register of Historic Places in Lane County, Oregon
Road bridges on the National Register of Historic Places in Oregon
Wooden bridges in Oregon
Howe truss bridges in the United States